The Marshall Thundering Herd men's basketball team, representing the Marshall University, has had 20 players drafted into the National Basketball Association (NBA) since the league began holding the yearly event in 1947. Andy Tonkovich was the first Marshall player drafted when he was selected first overall in the 1948 draft. 

Each NBA franchise seeks to add new players through an annual draft. The NBA uses a draft lottery to determine the first three picks of the NBA draft; the 14 teams that did not make the playoffs the previous year are eligible to participate. After the first three picks are decided, the rest of the teams pick in reverse order of their win–loss record. To be eligible for the NBA Draft, a player in the United States must be at least 19 years old during the calendar year of the draft and must be at least one year removed from the graduation of his high school class. From 1967 until the ABA–NBA merger in 1976, the American Basketball Association (ABA) held its own draft.

Key

Players selected in the NBA draft

Notes

References
General

 
 
 

Specific

Marshall
 
Marshall Thundering Herd NBA draft